The following is a list of awards and nominations received by American actor Robin Williams.

Robin Williams (1951–2014) was an American actor and comedian. He started his career as a standup comedian, receiving nine Grammy Award nominations and winning four for Best Comedy Album for Reality ... What a Concept (1980), A Night at the Met (1986), Good Morning Vietnam (1987), and Robin Williams - Live in 2002. He also gained a national audience as the alien Mork in the ABC sitcom Mork & Mindy (1978-1982), where he earned his first Primetime Emmy Award nomination. He went on to receive nine Emmy Award nominations, winning twice for Outstanding Performance in a Variety or Music Program for Carol, Carl, Whoopi and Robin (1987), and ABC Presents A Royal Gala (1988).

Throughout the course of his film and television career, he won numerous awards. He received four Academy Award nominations, including three consecutive nominations for his performances in Good Morning, Vietnam (1988), Dead Poets Society (1989), and  The Fisher King (1991). He received the Academy Award for Best Supporting Actor for his role in the drama Good Will Hunting (1997) directed by Gus Van Sant and co-written by Matt Damon and Ben Affleck. Williams also won six Golden Globe Awards, including Best Actor – Motion Picture Musical or Comedy for his roles in Good Morning, Vietnam (1987), The Fisher King (1991) and Mrs. Doubtfire (1993), along with the Special Golden Globe Award for Vocal Work in a Motion Picture for his role Genie in Aladdin (1992), and Cecil B. DeMille award in 2005. In 2009 he received the Disney Legends award.

Major associations

Academy Awards

British Academy Film Awards

Emmy Awards

Golden Globe Awards

Grammy Awards
When Williams won the Grammy Award for Best Spoken Word Comedy Album in 2003, it was a separate category from the Grammy Award for Best Spoken Word Album.  The latter was intended for audiobooks and similar non-comedic recordings.

Screen Actors Guild Awards

Miscellaneous awards

Kids' Choice Awards

MTV Awards

Online Film & TV Association

Satellite Awards

Saturn Awards

Critics awards

Inductions

See also
 Robin Williams filmography

References

Williams, Robin